Franz Geyling (Vienna 16 June 1803 - Steyr, 3 May 1875) was an Austrian painter of historical and religious canvases and frescoes.

He held expositions in Vienna from 1839 on.

Major works : 
He renovated the frescoes of Daniel Gran (1694 – 1757) in the St. Annakirche in Vienna. 
He also painted in 1836 the frescoes in the dome of the Dominican church in Vienna. It shows Madonna and Child under the golden light of the Trinity, surrounded by kneeling Angels 
He was also involved with the Baroque decorations in the Sankt Pölten abbey.
The ceiling frescoes in the chapel of the castle Burg Raabs an der Thaya (Lower Austria)

References
Benezit E., Dictionnaire des Peintres, Sculpteurs, Dessinateurs et Graveurs - Librairie Gründ, Paris, 1976;   (in French)

1803 births
1875 deaths
19th-century Austrian painters
19th-century Austrian male artists
Austrian male painters
Fresco painters